Irvine Meadows Amphitheatre (later known as Verizon Wireless Amphitheatre) was an amphitheater operating from 1981-2016 in Irvine, California. The venue was built in 1980 funded by four local private investors under the Irvine Meadows Partnership. Providing 10,418 reserved seats, and 5,667 on the lawn seating, the outdoor arena was the largest amphitheater in Orange County until its final closure. The architecture was designed by Gin Wong Associates based in Los Angeles. The unique design of this venue was building it on a hillside creating a natural steep slope toward the stage.

History
The site was previously part of the Lion Country Safari, one of seven such parks located in the United States. The owner of the safari park held a 29-year lease, and subleased a portion to the owners of the Irvine Meadows Amphitheatre in 1981. The safari park closed in 1984, with the owner still holding 13 years on the lease, which he then subleased to the operators of the Wild Rivers water park and the Camp Frasier (later Camp James) summer camp, which became the neighbors of the Irvine Meadows Amphitheatre. The water park and summer camp closed in 2011, with the land turned into a housing development by the Irvine Company.

Tom Petty and the Heartbreakers were the first rock act to perform there, on September 18, 1981. They were joined onstage by surprise guest Stevie Nicks, who performed "Stop Draggin' My Heart Around" with the band.

Since 1987, the establishment has been the summer home of the Pacific Symphony Orchestra, as well as the annual KROQ Weenie Roast.

The amphitheatre was famous for hosting popular music festivals, which includes: Area2 Festival, Fishfest, Gigantour, Lilith Fair, Lollapalooza, Projekt Revolution and Uproar Festival, a benefit concert for the recently deceased Social Distortion guitarist Dennis Danell.  Ozzy Osbourne recorded a performance called Speak of the Devil at the venue on June 12, 1982, for home video release in Japan; said video was eventually released on DVD in the US in 2012.

Bon Jovi performed at the Amphitheatre for three consecutive nights on their Slippery When Wet Tour, from June 20th to June 22nd 1987.

Pop superstar Michael Jackson performed three concerts at the amphitheatre November 7–9, 1988 during his Bad Tour.

Phish performed two single-night engagements there in 1999 and 2000.

Oingo Boingo played its annual Halloween concerts here from 1986 through 1991, and one final time in 1993, before moving the remaining 1994 and 1995 shows to Universal Amphitheatre in Los Angeles. Live Nation (formerly SFX Entertainment) bought the lease on the Amphitheatre in 1998.

Rush performed here on June 29, 1990 for the band’s Presto tour.

Tangerine Dream performed on June 6, 1986 recorded on bootleg Sonambulistic Imagery. The Smiths performed on August 28, 1986 on the band's The Queen is Dead tour.

The Grateful Dead performed at the amphitheatre fifteen times from 1983 through 1989.

Because of the 1993 opening of the Arrowhead Pond of Anaheim (now Honda Center), Irvine Meadows became increasingly an alternative to the much larger Pond, in addition to being a venue for amphitheater tours.

The Eagles performed six consecutive nights from May 27–June 1, 1994, for their reunion tour entitled ‘Hell Freezes Over’. Prince and The New Power Generation performed at the amphitheatre during the Jam of the Year Tour on October 12, 1997.

Iron Maiden, Motorhead, Dio performed at the Irvine Verizon Amphitheater on August 24, 2003 while Mars was vividly visible to the audiences against the backdrop of the stage.

Dream Theater/Megadeath performed at Irvine Verizon Amphitheater on July 24, 2005. 

Kelly Clarkson performed at the amphitheatre on August 1, 2006, during her Addicted Tour. Once the show was over she wrote "Irvine", a hidden track off her 2007 album My December, there at the venue.

Miley Cyrus performed at the amphitheatre in October 2008 for the promotional show of the series Hannah Montana.

Fall Out Boy performed on March 26 on their Winter is Coming Tour in 2016. Bernie Sanders hosted a political rally here on May 22, 2016.

Judas Priest played here in 1991.

The Amphitheatre was renamed to the Verizon Wireless Amphitheatre in April 2000. The 7 year sponsorship deal between Verizon Wireless and SFX Entertainment, then owner of the amphitheatre, was a multimillion-dollar contract. Verizon renewed this contract for another 7 years, extending it to 2014. It did not opt to renew a second time and the name reverted to its original "Irvine Meadows Amphitheatre" in 2015.

Gwen Stefani was the last performer for the venue on October 29 and 30, 2016.

The Irvine Company had informed the operators of the amphitheatre that the land lease would not be renewed after 2016, so the amphitheatre was closed and demolition started in November 2016, shortly after the final concert. The Irvine Company chose to build housing on the terrain, such that the entire space of the original Irvine-based Lion Country Safari Park would become a 3,700-unit housing development.

Live Nation and FivePoint built a temporary amphitheatre at the Orange County Great Park named FivePoint Amphitheatre in 2017, for a limited term of 3 years, based on the Conditional Use Permit process.

See also
List of contemporary amphitheatres

References

External links
 Irvine Meadows Says Its Final Goodbyes Before Getting Demolished for Apartments - OC Weekly

Amphitheaters in California
Verizon Communications
Buildings and structures in Irvine, California
Tourist attractions in Irvine, California